Dewtron was the trade mark of Design Engineering (Wokingham) Ltd. or D. E. W. Ltd. a small British electronics manufacturer, founded by Brian H. Baily on 5 February 1964. In adverts the company address is always given as, Ringwood Road, Ferndown, Dorset, never Wokingham.

Products 
One of the earliest advertised Dewtron product was the Dewtron Wave Trap, a device to boost the reception of medium wave radio broadcasts,  another was the Dewbox, a 2 inch by  inch plastic enclosure in variable lengths. 

Later on Synthesizers were advertised either pre-built or as kits of resin potted modules. By 1970 the company's products included oscillators, voltage controlled amplifiers, sample and hold and envelope shapers. Chris Carter, later to form Throbbing Gristle, experimented with Dewtron kit-based synthesizers early in his music career,  as did Chris Watson of Cabaret Voltaire. In 1973 Ian Craig Marsh, (a founding member of The Human League and later to form Heaven 17) built himself a Dewtron synthesiser.

The Dewtron Mister Bassman bass pedal synthesizer was used by Mike Rutherford on Genesis albums from Nursery Cryme (1971) onwards, before replacing it with a Moog Taurus I for the album A Trick of the Tail (1976). Yes' frontman Jon Anderson used a similar unit in live performances. John Paul Jones plays a Mister Bassman on Since I've Been Loving You on the album Led Zeppelin III.

See also 
 List of synthesizer manufacturers

Notes

References

External links 
 Dewtron, or how to hide your magic (if you have it)
 1970's Dewtron "Mister Bassman" Bass Pedal Synth Dewtron "Mister Bassman" Bass Pedal Synth
 An article about Dewtron "Mister Bassman" Bass Pedal Synth
 Dewtron at SynthMuseum.com
 Rediscovering the Dewtron Wave Trap, Short Wave Magazine, December 1993, p. 34
 Dewtron, Effects Database. Shows a Dewtron Fuzzorama and Dewtron Wah-Wah with resin potted circuitry, both fitted in Dewboxes.  

Synthesizer manufacturing companies  of the United Kingdom
Musical instrument manufacturing companies of the United Kingdom